Izze may refer to:

Izze-kloth, a sacred cord worn by Apache medicine men
Izze Beverage Company, a subsidiary of PepsiCo

See also
Izzi (disambiguation)
Izzy, a nickname